Mustjõe (Estonian for "Black River") is a subdistrict in the district of Haabersti, Tallinn, the capital of Estonia. It has a population of 3,181.

Gallery

References

Subdistricts of Tallinn